Annika Louise Reeder (born September 28, 1979 in Harlow, Essex, Great Britain) is a retired British artistic gymnast. She was the first gymnast from Great Britain to compete in two Olympic Games, in 1996 and 2000.

Reeder began gymnastics at the age of three in 1982, following in the footsteps of her sister Kirsty. She trained at the South Essex Gym Club under coach Rod Smith. She made her international debut at the 1993 Junior European Championships and entered the senior ranks in the following year.

In 1994 in Victoria, British Columbia, Canada Reeder became England's youngest ever Commonwealth Games gold medallist at the age of fourteen, collecting golds in the team and the floor exercise. She collected a third gold medal at the Commonwealths in 1998. Reeder was also a European floor finalist in 1994, and a vault finalist in 1998. In the 1996 European Championships in Birmingham, Reeder finished 14th in the all-around, the highest ranking recorded for a British athlete at the time. Reeder represented the UK at the 1994 team, 1994 individual, 1995, 1996, 1997 and 1999 World Championships. She was a two-time Champion and four-time silver medalist at British Nationals and the English Champion in 1996.

Great Britain did not qualify to send a full team to the 1996 Olympics, but were permitted to send two gymnasts to compete as individuals. Reeder was the higher-ranked of the two British gymnasts, placing 66th in the prelims. At the 2000 Olympics in Sydney Australia, Reeder captained the British women's team. The squad finished 10th, its best Olympic placement ever. Annika qualified to the all-around finals, the culmination of a lifetime's ambition. However, her bid to compete in the all-around would be undone by the infamous vault fiasco. Prior to the all-around, unbeknownst to the athletes and coaches, the vaulting horse was set 2 inches (5 cm) too low. This completely altered gymnasts' pre and post-flight, and resulted in many crashes, falls and injuries. Reeder vaulted on the faulty apparatus and was, perhaps, the worst affected by the error. She was so injured on her vault attempts that she had to be helped off the mats and was forced to withdraw from the remainder of the competition.

Eponymous skill
Reeder has one eponymous skill listed in the Code of Points.

References

External links
 Official site (Archived 2009-10-25)
 
 
 
 
 

1979 births
Living people
British female artistic gymnasts
English female artistic gymnasts
Olympic gymnasts of Great Britain
Gymnasts at the 1996 Summer Olympics
Gymnasts at the 2000 Summer Olympics
Commonwealth Games medallists in gymnastics
Commonwealth Games gold medallists for England
Commonwealth Games bronze medallists for England
Gymnasts at the 1994 Commonwealth Games
Gymnasts at the 1998 Commonwealth Games
Sportspeople from Harlow
Originators of elements in artistic gymnastics
Medallists at the 1994 Commonwealth Games
Medallists at the 1998 Commonwealth Games